L.O.V.Evil is the debut studio album by the Seattle-based Second Coming.

Track listing

Original release
All tracks written by Jesse "Maxi" Holt, except where noted.

Reissue

Personnel
The album's credits and personnel can be obtained from the liner notes.

Second Coming
Maxi — vocals, guitar and programming
James Bergstrom — drums
Johnny Bacolas — bass guitar
Mark Nelson — rhythm guitar

Production
Produced by Second Coming
Executive producer — Joshua B. Michaels

External links
[ Second Coming: AMG]
Maxi

References

1994 albums
Second Coming (band) albums